The ALFA Series of Revolvers are a series of Czech-made revolvers designed for law enforcement, private security agencies, personal security, and hunting needs. The ALFA Series is part of the three revolver series made by ALFA:
Series ALFA, Series ALFA Steel, and Series HOLEK. The revolvers in the ALFA Series all have a blued finish, and the only one to have no chrome finish is the 12-inch Sports model.

Overview
As the manufacturers' product page states:
The revolvers of cal. 357 Magnum have been designed to comply with requirements of demanding users from among the law enforcement corps, private security agencies and citizens who take their safety seriously. The design of cartridge cylinder mounting in tilting console and shock transition control from the console to the frame considers as much as possible maintaining the minimum limits for a long time. Cylinder rotation design takes no compromise in forcing the cylinder turn by exact spacing distance to safely adjust to the barrel leaving no reckon on inertia of the cylinder to finish its turning movement. The user obtains thus a guarantee of safe action disabled when the cartridge is off the barrel axis even if the cylinder is braked, e.g. with impurities. The combination of 357 Magnum cartridge high output and our revolver makes up a reliable arms system for any crisis situation. Drop safety and all-steel design guarantee a high level of safety when carried under any condition. The accuracy and power of the six-inch version is a challenge for hunters using short guns.

Models
There are seven revolver models in the ALFA Series, each one longer and heavier than the last.
All the models have a 6-round cylinder capacity and use a powerful .357 Magnum cartridge.

Model 3520
Length, 7.5 inches (192 millimeters)
Barrel Length, 2 inches (51 millimeters)
Weight, 1.8 pounds (850 grams)
Sights, Fixed Iron

Model 3530
Length, 8.5 inches (217 millimeters)
Barrel Length, 3 inches (76 millimeters)
Weight, 1.9 pound (890 grams)
Sights, fixed iron

Model 3531
Length, 8.5 inches (217 millimeters)
Barrel Length, 3 inches (76 millimeters)
Weight, 1.9 pounds (900 grams)
Sights, Adjustable Iron

Model 3540
Length, 9.5 inches (243 millimeters)
Barrel Length, 4 inches (102 millimeters)
Weight, 2.1 pounds (990 grams)
Sights, Fixed Iron

Model 3541
Length, 9.5 inches (243 millimeters)
Barrel Length, 4 inches (102 millimeters)
Weight, 2.2 pounds (1000 grams)
Sights, Adjustable Iron

Model 3551C Produced for the Canadian Market
Length, 10.0 inches (255 millimeters)
Barrel Length, 4.5 inches (114 millimeters)
Weight, 2.2 pounds (1050 grams)
Sights, Adjustable Iron

Model 3561
Length, 11.5 inches (293 millimeters)
Barrel Length, 6 inches (152 millimeters)
Weight, 2.5 pounds (1150 grams)
Sights, Adjustable Iron

Model 3563 Sport
Length, 11.8 inches (300 millimeters)
Barrel Length, 6 inches (152 millimeters)
Weight, 3 pounds (1390 grams)
Sights, LPA

See also
 List of firearms
 ALFA Combat
 ALFA Defender
 Series ALFA Steel

References
Product Page

Revolvers of Czechoslovakia
Revolvers
.357 Magnum firearms